Jeanine Sobek (born February 22, 1972) is a former women's ice hockey player from Minnesota. She competed for the Northeastern Huskies in Hockey East of the NCAA. During the 2000-01 NWHL season, she competed for the Brampton Thunder.

Playing career
As a child, she would skate on the outdoor rinks near Coon Rapids, Minnesota.

College career
Sobek led the Huskies in scoring in 1991-92 (46 points) and 1992-93 (42 points), respectively. For two consecutive campaigns, Sobek led the Huskies in goals scored with 21 (1992–93) and 24 (1993–94). During the 1991–92 season, Sobek was also the Huskies' leader in assists with 34. The following season (1992–93), she tied Rayanne Conway for the assists lead with 21.

In 106 career contests with the Huskies, she registered 159 points. As of 2010, her 77 goals were fifth all-time among all Huskies skaters, while her 82 assists also ranked fifth.

USA Hockey
From 1990 to 1997, she was a member of the United States women's national team. During the national team's 1997 tour, she participated in a 9–0 defeat of her former school. Despite being a national team member for seven years, she was not on the final roster for the 1998 Winter Olympics in Nagano, Japan.

References

1972 births
Living people
American women's ice hockey forwards
Brampton Thunder players
Northeastern Huskies women's ice hockey players
People from Coon Rapids, Minnesota